Pavel Kuběna (born April 1, 1988) is a Czech professional ice hockey right winger for Mostečtí Lvi of the Czech 2.liga.

Kuběna previously played 140 games in the Czech Extraliga for HC Karlovy Vary. He also played with HC Košice in the Slovak Extraliga during the 2012–13 Slovak Extraliga season.

References

External links

1988 births
Living people
HC Baník Sokolov players
Czech ice hockey right wingers
HC Karlovy Vary players
HC Košice players
HC Most players
Piráti Chomutov players
HC Slovan Ústečtí Lvi players
Sportovní Klub Kadaň players
People from Blansko
Sportspeople from the South Moravian Region
Czech expatriate ice hockey players in the United States